Fagrifoss is a waterfall located in the Highland in Iceland. Access to the waterfall requires the crossing of a river ford, for which a 4x4 vehicle is needed.

References

See also

 List of waterfalls of Iceland

Waterfalls of Iceland